Pant-y-Ffynnon Quarry is a stone quarry in the Vale of Glamorgan, Wales, around 3 kilometers east of Cowbridge. It contains fissure fill deposits dating to the Late Triassic (Rhaetian), hosted within karsts of Carboniferous aged limestone, primarily the Friars Point Limestone Formation. Remains of numerous small vertebrates, notably archosaurs, are known from the fissure fills in the quarry, similar to other Late Triassic-Early Jurassic fissure fill deposits known from Southwest England and southern Wales.

History 
The quarry was likely in use since at least the 1910s, and the first fossil specimens discovered at the quarry were collected by palaeontologists Kenneth Kermack and Pamela Robinson of University College London between 1951 and 1952, and were first presented at a talk in 1953 and later written on briefly in 1956. The quarry was abandoned during the 1960s and few fossil discoveries have been made there since. Much of the remains discovered between 1951-52 were left undescribed until the 21st century, with most only initially being briefly described upon discovery.

Vertebrate paleofauna

References

Geologic formations
Quarries in Wales